Al Jennings of Oklahoma is a 1951 American Western film directed by Ray Nazarro and starring Dan Duryea and Gale Storm. It is based on the story of Al Jennings, a former train robber turned attorney.

Premise
The rambunctious youngest son of a family of lawyers turns against the justice system after the murder of his brother and becomes the leader of a notorious bandit gang.

Cast
 Dan Duryea as Al Jennings 
 Gale Storm as Margo St. Claire 
 Dick Foran as Frank Jennings 
 Gloria Henry as Alice Calhoun 
 Guinn 'Big Boy' Williams as Lon Tuttle
 Raymond Greenleaf as Judge Jennings 
 Stanley Andrews as Marshal Ken Slattery 
 John Ridgely as Railroad Detective Dan Hanes 
 James Millican as Ed Jennings 
 Harry Shannon as Fred Salter
 John Dehner as Tom Marsden

Production
The film, directed by Ray Nazarro on a screenplay by George Bricker and a subject by Al J. Jennings and Will Irwin, was produced by Rudolph C. Flothow for Columbia Pictures and shot in Iverson Ranch at Chatsworth, Los Angeles, California, from mid-April to late May 1950.

References

Bibliography
 Paul Varner. The A to Z of Westerns in Cinema. Scarecrow Press, 2009.

External links
 

1951 films
1951 Western (genre) films
1950s English-language films
American Western (genre) films
Films directed by Ray Nazarro
Columbia Pictures films
1950s American films